Rodney Stuart Pattisson, MBE (born 5 August 1943) is a British yachtsman. He is a double Olympic gold medalist in sailing won at the 1968 Mexico City Olympics and 1972 Munich Olympics both in the Flying Dutchman class.  He also won a silver medal at the 1976 Montreal Olympics in the same class to become Great Britain’s most successful Olympic yachtsman until Ben Ainslie overtook him with 3 gold medals and a silver medal at four different Olympic Games at the 2008 Beijing Olympics. Pattisson was a member of Itchenor Sailing Club.

Sailing career 
Pattisson was born in Campbeltown, Argyll, Scotland, where his father was posted as an airman during World War II. His family left Scotland just two months after Rodney's birth, and he has never lived in Scotland since then.

He went to school at Pangbourne College, which was founded in 1917 as the Nautical College Pangbourne.  The College prepared boys to be officers in the Merchant Navy although many students joined the Royal Navy, a tradition he followed on leaving the college.

He later teamed up with the London solicitor Iain MacDonald-Smith and won the 1968 Olympic trials.  They travelled to Mexico two months before the start of the Olympics in order to acclimatise themselves to the local conditions.  In 1968 Pattisson and MacDonald-Smith won the gold medal in the Flying Dutchman class in the Olympic Games on their boat Supercalifragilisticexpialidocious, which was shortened by race officials to Superdocious.  Notes from the race indicate that its dominating length of lead mirrored the length of name.  The boat is now in the collection of the National Maritime Museum Cornwall.  At the time it was noted that in winning the gold, Pattisson became the first "Scot" to win an Olympic medal in sailing.  Both Pattisson and MacDonald-Smith went on to win the FD (Flying Dutchman) World Championship in 1969 and 1970.  After his Olympic victory in 1968, Pattisson resigned his commission in the Royal Navy so as to give himself more time for training.  As Lieutenant Rodney Stuart Pattisson, he was appointed a Member of the Order of the British Empire (MBE) in the 1969 New Year Honours for his services to yachting. He won another World Championship in 1971, but this time it was with Julian Brooke-Houghton.  A second Olympic gold medal followed in 1972 with Christopher Davies and in 1976 Pattisson took the silver medal again with Julian Brooke-Houghton.  Pattisson was honoured by being the flag-bearer at the opening ceremony of the 1976 Montreal Olympics.

Pattisson then retired from the Olympics and later co-skippered the Victory 83, the Peter de Savary entry in the America's Cup in 1983.

He was later elected to the Sailing Hall of Fame and Scottish Sports Hall of Fame. He later asked to be withdrawn from the Scottish Sports Hall of Fame in 2012 as he does not consider himself Scottish.

Published works

Notes

References

External links

 
 
 

1943 births
Living people
1983 America's Cup sailors
British male sailors (sport)
English male sailors (sport)
English Olympic medallists
Olympic gold medallists for Great Britain
Olympic medalists in sailing
Olympic sailors of Great Britain
Olympic silver medallists for Great Britain
Sailors at the 1968 Summer Olympics – Flying Dutchman
Sailors at the 1972 Summer Olympics – Flying Dutchman
Sailors at the 1976 Summer Olympics – Flying Dutchman
Medalists at the 1968 Summer Olympics
Medalists at the 1972 Summer Olympics
Medalists at the 1976 Summer Olympics
Flying Dutchman class world champions
World champions in sailing for Great Britain
Members of the Order of the British Empire
People educated at Pangbourne College
People from Campbeltown
Royal Navy officers
Sportspeople from Argyll and Bute